Hsu Feng-pin (born 10 October 1981) is a Taiwanese baseball player who currently plays for Uni-President Lions of Chinese Professional Baseball League. Although originally an outfielder, he occasionally played as second baseman for the Lions.

References

1981 births
Living people
Uni-President 7-Eleven Lions players
Baseball players from Tainan
Baseball outfielders